Rest is an unincorporated community in northern Frederick County, Virginia, United States. Rest is located along U.S. Route 11 south of the West Virginia state line with Berkeley County. The community of Ridgeway lies to its north.

References

Unincorporated communities in Frederick County, Virginia
Unincorporated communities in Virginia